Miss Illusion refers to:

"Miss Illusion", a song by Bang Camaro from Bang Camaro II
"Miss Illusion", a song by Murray Head from Nigel Lived